Margarete Lanner  (1896–1981) was a German stage and film actress. She appeared in around 30 films during the silent and early sound eras in a mixture of leading and supporting roles. She had a small part in Fritz Lang's 1927 film Metropolis.

Partial filmography
 Colombine (1920)
 Love and Passion (1921)
 Don Juan (1922)
 Jimmy: The Tale of a Girl and Her Bear (1923)
 The Final Mask (1924)
 The Second Mother (1925)
 The Gentleman Without a Residence (1925)
 The Dice Game of Life (1925)
 The Telephone Operator (1925)
 Battle of the Sexes (1926)
 The Young Man from the Ragtrade (1926)
 Eternal Allegiance (1926)
 The Priest from Kirchfeld (1926)
 Metropolis (1927)
 The Woman from the Folies Bergères (1927)
 The Man with the Counterfeit Money (1927)
 A Girl of the People (1927)
 The Impostor (1927)
 The Woman from Till 12 (1928)
 The Hour of Temptation (1936)
 The Accusing Song (1936)

References

Bibliography
 Jacobsen, Wolfgang & Sudendorf, Werner. Metropolis. Axel Menges, 2000.

External links

1896 births
1981 deaths
German silent film actresses
German film actresses
German stage actresses
Actresses from Hamburg
20th-century German actresses